Andriy Vasylyovych Mandziy (born 19 February 1988 in Kremenets, Ternopil Oblast, Ukraine) is a Ukrainian luger. He competed at the 2014 and 2018 Winter Olympics.

Career
Mandziy's first World Cup season was the 2008–09 season. He finished in his first World Cup race 46th in Igls, Austria. As of February 2022, Madziy's best personal World Cup finish was 14th during the 2020–21 season in the men's singles event held in Winterberg, Germany.

At the 2014 Winter Olympics, he was 31st in the men's singles event.

On December 27, 2017, Mandziy qualified for the 2018 Winter Olympics. At the Olympics, he was 40th in singles' race due to losing control over his luge during the first race.

In 2022, Andriy Mandziy was nominated for his third Winter Games in Beijing.

Personal life
Andriy Mandziy graduated from Lviv State University of Physical Culture. He works as a sports instructor. His hobbies are music and sports.

Career results

Winter Olympics

World Championships

European Championships

Luge World Cup

Rankings

References

External links
 
 
 

1988 births
Living people
People from Kremenets
Ukrainian male lugers
Lugers at the 2014 Winter Olympics
Lugers at the 2018 Winter Olympics
Lugers at the 2022 Winter Olympics
Olympic lugers of Ukraine
Sportspeople from Ternopil Oblast